Sprengers is a surname. Notable people with the surname include:

Jeu Sprengers (1938–2008), Dutch football official
Thomas Sprengers (born 1990), Belgian cyclist